The Dekalb Advertiser is a weekly newspaper published in Fort Payne, Alabama and serving the DeKalb County, Alabama region. The publisher is Brandon K. Pierce of Pierce Publications, LLC.
The Dekalb Advertiser was founded and published by Jerry Whittle, a former editor of the Times-Journal, another local newspaper. The staff of The DeKalb Advertiser includes: Kelly Bunch, Brian Robertson, Matt Silvestro, Monia K. Smith, Jon Voils, and Kim Whittle.

Newspapers published in Alabama
Publications with year of establishment missing